David "Dave" Palmer (born  in Marlborough, Massachusetts) is an American wheelchair curler.

He participated in the 2014 Winter Paralympics where American team finished on fifth place.

Teams

References

External links 

 Profile at the official website for the Sochi 2014 Paralympic Winter Games (web archive)
 Wikinews interviews USA wheelchair curler David Palmer - Wikinews
 Cape Cod Curling Club - How Wheelchair Curling started at the Cape Cod Curling Club

Living people
1960 births
People from Marlborough, Massachusetts
Sportspeople from Middlesex County, Massachusetts
American male curlers
American disabled sportspeople
American wheelchair curlers
Paralympic wheelchair curlers of the United States
Wheelchair curlers at the 2014 Winter Paralympics